The Allegheny Toyota Autumn Leaf Festival is a nine-day festival held annually in Clarion, Pennsylvania in the United States. It features food, events and entertainment such as carnival rides, Riverhill Battery Warehouse Power Wheels Derby, cultural nights, Clarion University's homecoming weekend and football game, and concerts. About 300,000 people attend annually.

History

This annual festival began in 1953 and became the first recognized Autumn Leaf Festival to be held during the Clarion State College homecoming. Businesses were asked to decorate to add color to the town. Ruth Neiger from Brockway served as Homecoming Queen that year.

The following year, 1954, a larger festival was held to attract more people to the area. There were two parades. The first was held from 9:30 a.m. until noon. It included veterans from foreign wars, Girl Scouts, volunteer firemen, the Lions Club, the Autumn Leaf Queen’s float, and seven Clarion County bands. A band from Redbank’s received a $50 prize for first place. Two and a half hours later, the Clarion State Teachers College held their homecoming parade with floats made by local fraternities, and as the years went on, local sororities joined in the parade. In 1958, the Autumn Leaf Festival became a permanent event, and the Chamber implemented a committee to organize the festivities. Both high schools and colleges worked together producing floats for the parade. With bands, cars, horses, marching units, and drill teams joining the floats, the 2009 parade lasted an hour and 15 minutes and was described by the Clarion Republican that year as the “Best Autumn Leaf Festival Yet”.

In 1956, the annual “Tournament of Leaves” parade was part of the Clarion State Teachers College Homecoming. Clarion businesses donated monetary prizes for the float competition, for which the theme followed movie titles.

The Miss Teen Autumn Leaf Festival scholarship pageant, which started out as a homecoming queen who got to ride in the parade, became a permanent event in 1977. 

The Farmers and Crafters Day usually occurs during the last Friday of the nine-day festival. This festival started in 1977 and was originally called Farmers and Merchants Day Craft Show. On this day, 10,000-plus patrons and students come out to observe, buy from or promote the craft stands that line the main street of Clarion on both sides. The local Clarion University of Pennsylvania gives its students a "mid-semester break", so they can attend the crafters' day the following day.

References

Clarion County, Pennsylvania
Annual events in Pennsylvania
Festivals in Pennsylvania